Leathermouth (often typeset as LeATHERMØUTH) was an American hardcore punk band led by Frank Iero. The band formed in 2007, and in January 2009 released their first album XO.

History
Leathermouth was formed in 2007 by some friends of My Chemical Romance's rhythm guitarist Frank Iero. Iero had heard a few demo tracks from the band, and wanted to sign the band to his own independent label, Skeleton Crew. It was not until the previous lead singer had failed to write any lyrics that Iero became a member. He uses the band as a way to vent the frustrations he has with the current political and social climate; he has additionally stated that writing the lyrics was a way for him to cope with anxiety and depression he had felt during his life, with some of the songs written before the band had even formed. As a member of Leathermouth, this is the first project where he contributes lyrics and lead vocals since Pencey Prep (who broke up shortly after My Chemical Romance was formed). Leathermouth played their first shows in the summer of 2008 alongside Warship for the late 2008 Reggie and the Full Effect "Farewell Tour". Iero hoped to tour with Leathermouth when he was not working with My Chemical Romance.

In October 2008, Leathermouth signed to Epitaph Records, as opposed to Frank Iero's label as originally planned. Iero thought that it would be difficult to promote the album himself, if released through his own label, with his current obligations to My Chemical Romance and the other bands signed to his label. Epitaph Records president, Brett Gurewitz, was impressed with the band's "intensity and songwriting of the music." Leathermouth released their first studio album on January 27, 2009, through Epitaph entitled XO. Although the album did not chart on the Billboard 200, it did reach No. 21 on the Top Heatseekers chart.

In a 2012 interview with Iero, he revealed that many of the other band members turned to religion and decided not to be a part of Leathermouth anymore. Iero also stated he would like to continue Leathermouth, but is unsure if it will actually happen. He said, "There's still part of me that would hate not doing that band again. There's something brewing, but I don't know what it is. I really wanted that band to go on longer, but Jesus had other plans."

On May 19, 2013, Leathermouth performed at New Jersey's Skate and Surf Festival along with Glassjaw, Rx Bandits, A Day to Remember and others.

On September 13, 2018 Frank Iero announced the band would finally be releasing their debut album on vinyl via Epitaph Records on November 9, 2018.

Band members
Final Line-Up
 Frank Iero – lead vocals (2007–2010, 2013)
 Rob Hughes – lead guitar, backing vocals (2007–2010, 2013)
 Ed Auletta – rhythm guitar (2008–2010, 2013)
 John McGuire  – bass, backing vocals (2008–2010, 2013)
 James Dewees – drums, percussion (2008–2010, 2013)

Former members
 Andrew Escobar – bass, backing vocals (2007)
 Vincent Averelli – rhythm guitar (2007)
 Steve Oyola – drums, percussion (2007)

Timeline

Discography
Studio albums
XØ (2009)

Videography
 "Bodysnatchers 4 Ever" (2008)

References

External links

Epitaph Records artists
Musical groups reestablished in 2013
Hardcore punk groups from New Jersey